Renegade is a wooden roller coaster at Valleyfair in Shakopee, Minnesota, that was designed by Great Coasters International. It was one of the first coasters built by Great Coasters International to use their Millennium Flyer trains, which are designed to give a smoother ride. Renegade's layout is a combination of an out-and-back and a twister roller coaster.

Overview
The track was built at a cost of approximately $6.5 million. Two trains, consisting of 24 seats, accommodate 850 riders per hour.

This coaster has two rare features: the initial first drop and a high-speed station fly-by. The first hill of this coaster features an S-shaped drop. It initially goes down in one direction and at half-way twists in the opposite direction. Before the train comes back to the station it does a final high speed fly-by of the loading station. Since its opening, it is one of the most popular rides at Valleyfair.

It was featured on Discovery Channel's Build It Bigger program on July 10, 2007.

Rankings

References

External links
Official page
Renegade's official page, including concept videos
Front Seat POV of Renegade in HD

Roller coasters introduced in 2007
Roller coasters operated by Cedar Fair
Roller coasters in Minnesota
Valleyfair